Zoran Amidžić (born 31 March 1972) is a former Serbian football defender.

Career
He played with FK Rudar Ugljevik in the Republika Srpska in Bosnia and Herzegovina before moving to Serbia where he played with FK Hajduk Kula and FK Proleter Zrenjanin in the First League of FR Yugoslavia.

He moved to Russia in 2001 and played with FC Arsenal Tula and FC Khimki in the Russian First Division until 2004, except the season 2003 that he played with FC Tobol in the Kazakhstan Premier League.

References

1972 births
Living people
Serbs of Bosnia and Herzegovina
Association football defenders
Bosnia and Herzegovina footballers
FK Rudar Ugljevik players
FK Hajduk Kula players
FK Proleter Zrenjanin players
FC Arsenal Tula players
FC Khimki players
FC Tobol players
First League of Serbia and Montenegro players
Russian First League players
Kazakhstan Premier League players
Bosnia and Herzegovina expatriate footballers
Expatriate footballers in Serbia and Montenegro
Bosnia and Herzegovina expatriate sportspeople in Serbia and Montenegro
Expatriate footballers in Russia
Bosnia and Herzegovina expatriate sportspeople in Russia
Expatriate footballers in Kazakhstan
Bosnia and Herzegovina expatriate sportspeople in Kazakhstan